12th Panzer Division may refer to:

 12th Panzer Division (Wehrmacht)
 12th Panzer Division (Bundeswehr)
 12th SS Panzer Division Hitlerjugend